Phangna Lien Pravongviengkham (March 4, 1929 – May 1980) was a Laotian ambassador.

Career
 In December 1958 he was employed in the OFFICE OF THE PRESIDENCY OF THE COUNCIL (OF MINISTERS).
From June 1959 to April 1964 he was secretary general of the council of ministers and served in the administrations of: Phoui Sananikone, Kou Abhay, Somsanith Vongkotrattana, Boun Oum and Souvanna Phouma.
In 1962 he entered the foreign service.
From April 1964 to June 1967 he was counselor  Chargé d'affaires of the royal Laotian embassy in Washington, D.C.
From June 1967 to October 1972 he was Secretary of state (Vice-Minister) for youth and sports.
From / to 1975 he was ambassador in Beijing.
In 1975 the government tried to get agreement for his ambassadorship in Washington, D.C., and he was appointed ambassador in Bangkok.
In 1975 he was recalled to Vientiane by executive order, sent to detain in Sam Neua detention camp No 5. 
On October 12, 1977 he was transferred to Torture Camp No 1 Prison cell No 2, where he was imposed to heavy punishment, hard labour, tortured, locked in underground cell, with inadequate food ration, poor nutrition, Death underground cell on May 1, 1980
 in ll.980 his grave was buried in the vicinity of Ban Naka Neau, Sop Hao district, province Houaphan, VH 438-745.

References

1929 births
1980 deaths
Ambassadors of Laos to China
People from Houaphanh province
Laotian people who died in prison custody